Charles Grey, 2nd Earl Grey  (13 March 1764 – 17 July 1845), known as Viscount Howick between 1806 and 1807, was a British Whig politician who served as Prime Minister of the United Kingdom from 1830 to 1834. He was a scion of the noble House of Grey and the namesake of Earl Grey tea.

Grey was a long-time leader of multiple reform movements, and during his time as prime minister his government brought about two notable reforms. The Reform Act 1832 enacted parliamentary reform, greatly increasing the electorate of the House of Commons. The Slavery Abolition Act 1833 led to the abolition of slavery in most of the British Empire, with compensation to be paid to slave-owners. Grey was a strong opponent of the foreign and domestic policies of William Pitt the Younger in the 1790s. In 1807, he resigned as foreign secretary to protest against George III's uncompromising rejection of Catholic emancipation. Grey finally resigned as prime minister in 1834 over disagreements in his cabinet regarding Ireland, and retired from politics. Scholars rank him highly among British prime ministers, believing that he averted much civil strife and enabled Victorian progress.

Early life

Descended from a long-established Northumbrian family seated at Howick Hall, Grey was the second but eldest surviving son of General Charles Grey, 1st Earl Grey KB (1729–1807) and his wife Elizabeth (1743/4–1822), a daughter of George Grey of Southwick, County Durham. He had four brothers and two sisters. He was educated at Richmond School, followed by Eton and Trinity College, Cambridge, acquiring a facility in Latin and in English composition and declamation that enabled him to become one of the foremost parliamentary orators of his generation.

Government career

Elected to Parliament, 1786
Grey was elected to Parliament for the Northumberland constituency on 14 September 1786, aged just 22. He became a part of the Whig circle of Charles James Fox, Richard Brinsley Sheridan, and the Prince of Wales, and soon became one of the major leaders of the Whig party. He was the youngest manager on the committee for prosecuting Warren Hastings. The Whig historian T. B. Macaulay wrote in 1841:

Grey was also noted for advocating Parliamentary reform and Catholic emancipation. His affair with Georgiana Cavendish, Duchess of Devonshire, herself an active political campaigner, did him little harm although it nearly caused her to be divorced by her husband.

Foreign secretary, 1806–1807
In 1806, Grey, by then Lord Howick owing to his father's elevation to the peerage as Earl Grey, became a part of the Ministry of All the Talents (a coalition of Foxite Whigs, Grenvillites, and Addingtonites) as First Lord of the Admiralty.

Following Fox's death later that year, Howick took over both as foreign secretary and as leader of the Whigs. The ministry broke up in 1807 when George III blocked Catholic Emancipation legislation and required that all ministers individually sign a pledge, which Howick refused to do, that they would not "propose any further concessions to the Catholics".

Years in opposition, 1807–1830

The government fell from power the next year, and, after a brief period as a member of parliament for Appleby from May to July 1807, Howick went to the Lords, succeeding his father as Earl Grey. He continued in opposition for the next 23 years. There were times during this period when Grey came close to joining the Government. In 1811, the Prince Regent tried to court Grey and his ally William Grenville to join the Spencer Perceval ministry following the resignation of Lord Wellesley. Grey and Grenville declined because the Prince Regent refused to make concessions regarding Catholic Emancipation. Grey's relationship with the Prince was strained further when his estranged daughter and heiress, Princess Charlotte, turned to him for advice on how to avoid her father's choice of husband for her.

On the Napoleonic Wars, Grey took the standard Whig party line. After being initially enthused by the Spanish uprising against Napoleon, Grey became convinced of the French emperor's invincibility following the defeat and death of Sir John Moore, the leader of the British forces in the Peninsular War. Grey was then slow to recognise the military successes of Moore's successor, the Duke of Wellington. When Napoleon first abdicated in 1814, Grey objected to the restoration of the Bourbons' authoritarian monarchy; and when Napoleon was reinstalled the following year, he said that the change was an internal French matter.

In 1826, believing that the Whig party no longer paid any attention to his opinions, Grey stood down as leader in favour of Lord Lansdowne. The following year, when George Canning succeeded Lord Liverpool as prime minister, it was, therefore, Lansdowne and not Grey who was asked to join the Government, which needed strengthening following the resignations of Robert Peel and the Duke of Wellington. When Wellington became prime minister in 1828, George IV (as the Prince Regent had become) singled out Grey as the one person he could not appoint to the Government.

Prime minister (1830–1834)

In 1830, following the death of George IV and when the Duke of Wellington resigned on the question of Parliamentary reform, the Whigs finally returned to power, with Grey as prime minister. In 1831, he was made a member of the Order of the Garter. His term was a notable one, seeing the passage of the Reform Act 1832, which finally saw the reform of the House of Commons, and the abolition of slavery throughout almost all of the British Empire in 1833 with the Slavery Abolition Act. As the years had passed, however, Grey had become more conservative, and he was cautious about initiating more far-reaching reforms, particularly since he knew that the King was at best only a reluctant supporter of reform.

Grey contributed to a plan to found a new colony in South Australia: in 1831 a "Proposal to His Majesty's Government for founding a colony on the Southern Coast of Australia" was prepared under the auspices of Robert Gouger, Anthony Bacon, Jeremy Bentham and Grey, but its ideas were considered too radical, and it was unable to attract the required investment. In the same year, Grey was appointed to serve on the Government Commission upon Emigration (which was wound up in 1832).

It was the issue of Ireland which precipitated the end of Grey's premiership in 1834. Lord Anglesey, the Lord Lieutenant of Ireland, preferred conciliatory reform including the partial redistribution of the income from the tithes to the Roman Catholic Church and away from the established Church of Ireland, a policy known as "appropriation". The Chief Secretary for Ireland, Lord Stanley, however, preferred coercive measures. The cabinet was divided, and when Lord John Russell drew attention in the House of Commons to their differences over appropriation, Stanley and others resigned. This triggered Grey to retire from public life, leaving Lord Melbourne as his successor. Unlike most politicians, he seems to have genuinely preferred a private life; colleagues remarked caustically that he threatened to resign at every setback.

Grey returned to Howick but kept a close eye on the policies of the new cabinet under Melbourne, whom he, and especially his family, regarded as a mere understudy until he began to act in ways of which they disapproved. Grey became more critical as the decade went on, being particularly inclined to see the hand of Daniel O'Connell behind the scenes and blaming Melbourne for subservience to the Radicals with whom he identified the Irish patriot. He made no allowances for Melbourne's need to keep the radicals on his side to preserve his shrinking majority in the Commons, and in particular, he resented any slight on his own great achievement, the Reform Act, which he saw as a final solution of the question for the foreseeable future. He continually stressed its conservative nature. As he declared in his last great public speech, at the Grey Festival organised in his honour at Edinburgh in September 1834, its purpose was to strengthen and preserve the established constitution, to make it more acceptable to the people at large, and especially the middle classes, who had been the principal beneficiaries of the Reform Act, and to establish the principle that future changes would be gradual, "according to the increased intelligence of the people, and the necessities of the times". It was the speech of a conservative statesman.

Lord Grey's ministry, November 1830 – July 1834

Lord Grey — First Lord of the Treasury and Leader of the House of Lords
Lord Brougham — Lord Chancellor
Lord Lansdowne — Lord President of the Council
Lord Durham — Lord Privy Seal
Lord Melbourne — Secretary of State for the Home Department
Lord Palmerston — Secretary of State for Foreign Affairs
Lord Goderich — Secretary of State for War and the Colonies
Sir James Graham — First Lord of the Admiralty
Lord Althorp — Chancellor of the Exchequer and Leader of the House of Commons
Charles Grant — President of the Board of Control
Lord Holland — Chancellor of the Duchy of Lancaster
The Duke of Richmond — Postmaster General
Lord Carlisle — Minister without Portfolio

Changes
June 1831 — Lord John Russell, the Paymaster of the Forces, and Edward Smith-Stanley, the Chief Secretary for Ireland, join the Cabinet.
April 1833 — Lord Goderich, now Lord Ripon, succeeds Lord Durham as Lord Privy Seal. Edward Smith-Stanley succeeds Ripon as Secretary of State for War and the Colonies. His successor as Chief Secretary for Ireland is not in the Cabinet. Edward Ellice, the Secretary at War, joins the Cabinet.
June 1834 — Thomas Spring Rice succeeds Stanley as Colonial Secretary. Lord Carlisle succeeds Ripon as Lord Privy Seal. Lord Auckland succeeds Graham as First Lord of the Admiralty. The Duke of Richmond leaves the Cabinet. His successor as Postmaster General is not in the Cabinet. Charles Poulett Thomson, the President of the Board of Trade, and James Abercrombie, the Master of the Mint, join the Cabinet.

Personal life

Before his marriage, Grey had an affair with the married Georgiana Cavendish, Duchess of Devonshire. Grey met Cavendish while attending a Whig society meeting in Devonshire House, and they became lovers. In 1791 she became pregnant and was sent to France, where she gave birth to an illegitimate daughter, who was raised by Grey's parents:
Eliza Courtney (20 February 1792 – 2 May 1859). She married Robert Ellice.

Marriage and legitimate children
On 18 November 1794, Grey married Mary Elizabeth Ponsonby (1776–1861), only daughter of William Ponsonby, 1st Baron Ponsonby of Imokilly and Louisa Molesworth. The marriage was a fruitful one; between 1796 and 1819 the couple had ten sons and six daughters:

unnamed daughter (stillborn, 1796)
Louisa Elizabeth Grey (7 April 1797 – 26 November 1841). She married John Lambton, 1st Earl of Durham, on 9 December 1816. They had five children, including Charles William, Grey's favourite grandson, who died young.
Elizabeth Grey (10 July 1798 – 8 November 1880). She married John Crocker Bulteel on 13 May 1826. They had five children.
Caroline Grey (30 August 1799 – 28 April 1875). She married Captain George Barrington on 15 January 1827. They had two children
Georgiana Grey (17 February 1801 – 13 September 1900), who never married.
Henry George Grey, 3rd Earl Grey (28 December 1802 – 9 October 1894). He married Maria Copley on 9 August 1832.
General Charles Grey (15 March 1804 – 31 March 1870). He married Caroline Farquhar on 26 July 1836. They had seven children, including Albert Grey, 4th Earl Grey. 
Admiral Sir Frederick William Grey (23 August 1805 – 2 May 1878). He married Barbarina Sullivan on 20 July 1846. 
Mary Grey (2 May 1807 – 6 July 1884). She married Charles Wood, 1st Viscount Halifax, on 29 July 1829. They had seven children.
William Grey (13 May 1808 – 11 February 1815), who died at the age of six.
Admiral George Grey (16 May 1809 – 3 October 1891). He married Jane Stuart (daughter of Patrick Stuart (British Army general)) on 20 January 1845. They had eleven children.
Thomas Grey (29 December 1810 – 8 July 1826), who died at the age of fifteen. 
Rev. John Grey MA, DD (2 March 1812 – 11 November 1895), Canon of Durham, Rector of Houghton-le-Spring. He married Lady Georgiana Hervey (daughter of Frederick William Hervey, 1st Marquess of Bristol) in July 1836. They had three children. He remarried Helen Spalding (maternal granddaughter of John Henry Upton, 1st Viscount Templetown) on 11 April 1874.
Rev. Francis Richard Grey MA (31 March 1813 – 22 March 1890), Canon of Durham, Canon of Newcastle, Rector of Morpeth. He married Lady Elizabeth Howard, daughter of George Howard, 6th Earl of Carlisle on 12 August 1840.
Captain Henry Cavendish Grey (16 October 1814 – 5 September 1880)
William George Grey (15 February 1819 – 19 December 1865). He married Theresa Stedink on 20 September 1858.

Later years and death

Grey spent his last years in contented, if sometimes fretful, retirement at Howick with his books, his family, and his dogs. The one great personal blow he suffered in old age was the death of his favourite grandson, Charles, at the age of 13. Grey became physically feeble in his last years and died quietly in his bed on 17 July 1845, forty-four years to the day since going to live at Howick. He was buried in the Church of St Michael and All Angels there on the 26th in the presence of his family, close friends, and the labourers on his estate.

His biographer G. M. Trevelyan argues:

Legacy

The monument was damaged by lightning in 1941 and the statue's head was knocked off. The monument lends its name to Monument Metro station on the Tyne and Wear Metro, located directly underneath. Grey Street in Newcastle upon Tyne, which runs south-east from the monument, is also named after Grey.

Durham University's Grey College is named after Grey, who as prime minister in 1832 supported the Act of Parliament that established the university.

Earl Grey tea, a blend which uses bergamot oil to flavour the brew, is commonly believed to be named after Grey, although the term was apparently first used decades after his death.

References

Further reading
 Brett, Peter. "Grey, Charles, 2nd Earl Grey" in 
 
 
 Pennington, D.H."British Prime Ministers : II Earl Grey." History Today (May 1951) 1#5 pp 21–27 online].
 Phillips, John A., and Charles Wetherell. "The Great Reform Act of 1832 and the political modernization of England." American historical review 100.2 (1995): 411–436. in JSTOR
  online free

Other sources
 
 
 
 
 Temperley, Harold and L.M. Penson, eds. Foundations of British Foreign Policy: From Pitt (1792) to Salisbury (1902) (1938), primary sources online

External links

 
 
 
 

1764 births
1845 deaths
19th-century prime ministers of the United Kingdom
Prime Ministers of the United Kingdom
British Secretaries of State for Foreign Affairs
Lords of the Admiralty
Members of the Privy Council of the United Kingdom
Whig (British political party) MPs
People educated at Eton College
Alumni of Trinity College, Cambridge
Garter Knights appointed by William IV
People from Howick, Northumberland
Earls Grey
Charles
Members of the Parliament of the United Kingdom for Tavistock
Members of the Parliament of Great Britain for English constituencies
Leaders of the House of Commons of the United Kingdom
Leaders of the House of Lords
British MPs 1784–1790
British MPs 1790–1796
British MPs 1796–1800
UK MPs 1801–1802
UK MPs 1802–1806
UK MPs 1806–1807
UK MPs 1807–1812
UK MPs who inherited peerages
Politicians awarded knighthoods